Kidi (also Romanized as Kīdī) is a village in Ahram Rural District, in the Central District of Tangestan County, Bushehr Province, Iran. At the 2006 census, its population was 34, in 7 families.

References 

Populated places in Tangestan County